Brubaker is a 1980 American prison drama film directed by Stuart Rosenberg. It stars Robert Redford as a newly arrived prison warden, Henry Brubaker, who attempts to clean up a corrupt and violent penal system. The screenplay by W. D. Richter is a fictionalized version of the 1969 book, Accomplices to the Crime: The Arkansas Prison Scandal by Tom Murton and Joe Hyams, detailing Murton's uncovering of the 1967 prison scandal.

The film features a large supporting cast, including Yaphet Kotto, Jane Alexander, Murray Hamilton, David Keith, Tim McIntire, Matt Clark, M. Emmet Walsh, Everett McGill, and an early appearance by Morgan Freeman. It was nominated for Best Original Screenplay at the 1981 Academy Awards.

Plot
In 1969, Henry Brubaker arrives at Wakefield State Prison in Arkansas disguised as an inmate. He immediately witnesses rampant abuse and corruption, including open and endemic sexual assault, torture, worm-ridden diseased food, fraud, and rampant graft. During a dramatic standoff involving Walter, a deranged prisoner who was being held in solitary confinement, Brubaker reveals himself to be the new prison warden, to the amazement of both prisoners and officials alike.

Brubaker attempts to reform the prison, with an eye towards prisoner rehabilitation and human rights, clashing frequently with corrupt officials on the state prison board who have profited from graft for decades. He recruits several longtime prisoners, including trustys Larry Lee Bullen, Richard "Dickie" Coombes, and former warden's clerk Purcell (who secretly remains loyal to the unscrupulous trustys) to assist him with the reform. Lillian Gray, a public relations specialist for the governor's office, also attempts to influence Brubaker to reform the prison in a way that will cast the governor in a positive light.

To improve the prison, Brubaker fires his crooked bookkeeper, who built up a stash of illicit food ostensibly for inmates but actually sold to generate profit, tosses the former prison doctor out of the facility when he learns inmates were being charged for medical treatment, and burns down an illicit pleasure shack on prison grounds where influential trusty Huey Rauch and his girlfriend Carol lived. After a faulty roof cave-in in the prison barracks, Brubaker meets with C.P. Woodward, a lumber salesman and longtime participant in the prison graft scheme. Accusing Woodward of using prisoners as slave labor and purposely pocketing contract money while intentionally building a shoddy, uninsured roof, Brubaker terminates Woodward's contract. He also oversees the formation of an inmate council, allowing the inmates to govern themselves. During the first meeting of the inmate council, Abraham Cook, an elderly black inmate still imprisoned three years after the end of his sentence, pulls Brubaker aside and confesses that he was instructed to construct coffins for murdered prisoners. Eddie Caldwell, a sadistic trustee, takes notice, and he, Purcell, and Rauch lure Abraham to the medical ward, where he is tortured with a Tucker Telephone. Brubaker attends the prison board meeting, where he discovers that many of the members are enraged at the disruption of their graft schemes via his reforms and are uninterested at investing any money to improve the prison. Brubaker accuses prison board head John Deach of defrauding the prison through insurance policies on nonexistent farm equipment (while leaving the prison buildings uninsured) before storming out of the meeting.

The morning after the prison board meeting, Brubaker awakes and discovers Abraham's body suspended from the warden's residence flagpole. While excavating the area Abraham disclosed to him, Brubaker discovers multiple unmarked graves which contain bodies of prisoners who died violently. Word reaches the governor's office, and Gray, alongside Edwards, a liberal member of the prison board, and corrupt State Senator Hite, attempt to convince Brubaker to stop excavating graves with the promise of funding for the prison, trying to convince him he has instead discovered an old pauper's graveyard. Brubaker refuses, and continues the excavations. Rauch rudely laments Abraham's confession, and Coombes, knowing Rauch's involvement in Abraham's death, threatens Rauch, who then escapes the prison and hides out at a local restaurant. Brubaker and several trustys pursue him, and in the resulting gunfight, Bullen and Rauch are killed. Due to the spillage of violence outside the prison walls, the board fires Brubaker and holds a hearing about the exhumed bodies where the board continues to lie about their origin. Brubaker walks in and makes a comment about saving taxpayer money by shooting prisoners rather than sending them to Wakefield, which enrages Deach. Brubaker leaves and Gray follows him, imploring him to compromise, but he refuses to compromise over murder.

Brubaker exits the prison as the new warden, hardline disciplinarian Rory Poke, addresses the prisoners. Coombes approaches Brubaker and tells him simply, "You were right." Coombes begins clapping, and the convicts ignore Poke and approach the fence, clapping a farewell to a teary Brubaker.

A pre-credits title card reads:

Cast
 Robert Redford as Henry Brubaker
 Yaphet Kotto as Dickie Coombes
 Jane Alexander as Lillian Gray
 Murray Hamilton as John Deach
 David Keith as Larry Lee Bullen
 Morgan Freeman as Walter
 Matt Clark as Purcell
 Tim McIntire as Huey Rauch
 Richard Ward as Abraham Cook
 M. Emmet Walsh as C.P. Woodward
 Albert Salmi as Rory Poke
 Linda Haynes as Carol
 Everett McGill as Caldwell
 Val Avery as Wendel
 Ronald C. Frazier as Willets
 David D. Harris as Duane Spivey
 Joe Spinell as Floyd Birdwell

In addition, Wilford Brimley, Nathan George and William Newman appeared as Prison Board Members, John McMartin as State Senator, and Nicolas Cage appeared in an uncredited background role as a prisoner, one year before his first credited role.

Production

Screenplay
The film is based on the real-life experiences of warden Thomas Murton, co-author with Joe Hyams of the 1969 book, Accomplices to the Crime: The Arkansas Prison Scandal. In 1967, he was hired by Governor Winthrop Rockefeller to reform Arkansas' Tucker State and Cummins State Prison Farms, but Murton was dismissed less than a year into the job because his work was creating too much bad publicity for the state's penal system—in particular, the discovery of numerous graves belonging to prisoners who had been killed in these prisons. Much of the squalid conditions, violence and corruption depicted in the film was the subject of a 1970 federal court case, Holt v. Sarver, in which the federal court ruled that Arkansas' prison system violated inmates' constitutional rights, and ordered reform.

The film was originally based on the Louisiana State Prison (Angola) but the State of Louisiana successfully sued to block publication of both the novel and the screenplay if it made references to conditions at Angola. Due to the successful legal outcome, violence and slavery-era treatment of inmates at Angola continued unabated throughout the 1980s and 1990s until two lawsuits were filed in 2013 regarding medical care and inhumane treatment, and excessive high temperatures at the facility. Angola's solitary confinement block, which had no air conditioning and had the highest suicide rates in the United States, was closed in 2018 after a 2013 lawsuit.

Filming
Rosenberg replaced Bob Rafelson, who was removed as director early in production. This would become Rosenberg's second prison film after directing Cool Hand Luke in 1967. Rafelson filed a breach-of-contract and slander lawsuit in May 1979 asking for damages of $10 million, claiming that Fox had assured him that he would have complete autonomy and creative control and had made statements that implied that he was incompetent, emotionally unstable, and not qualified to direct a major motion picture.

Most exteriors were filmed at the then-recently closed Junction City Prison in Junction City, southeast of Columbus in central Ohio. Additional locations included Bremen, New Lexington, and the Fairfield County Fairgrounds in Lancaster. The opening scenes of the prison bus departure show the skyline and a view up South Front Street in Columbus.

Novelization
A paperback screenplay novelization by the celebrated and award-winning American novelist and short story writer William Harrison was issued shortly in advance of the film's release (as was the custom of the era) by Ballantine Books.

Reception
Brubaker was a critical and commercial success. Produced on a budget of $9 million, the film grossed $37,121,708 in North America, earning $19.3 million in theatrical rentals, making it the 19th highest-grossing film of 1980. The movie was also well received by critics, holding a 75% "Fresh" rating on the review aggregate website Rotten Tomatoes based on 24 reviews.

Roger Ebert of the Chicago Sun-Times wrote:The movie (refuses) to permit its characters more human dimensions. We want to know these people better, but the screenplay throws up a wall; they act according to the ideological positions assigned to them in the screenplay, and that's that. ... Half of Redford's speeches could have come out of newspaper editorials, but we never find out much about him, What's his background? Was he ever married? Is this his first prison job? What's his relationship with the Jane Alexander character, who seems to have gotten him this job? (Alexander has one almost subliminal moment when she fans her neck and looks at Redford and, seems to be thinking unpolitical thoughts, but the movie hurries on.) Brubaker is a well-crafted film that does a harrowingly effective job of portraying the details of its prison, but then it populates it with positions rather than people."

Awards
Wins
 Motion Picture Sound Editors: Golden Reel Award. Best Sound Editing.

Nominations
 Academy Awards: Best Writing, Screenplay Written Directly for the Screen; W.D. Richter (screenplay/story) and Arthur A. Ross (story).

See also
 List of American films of 1980
 Arkansas Prison scandal

References

External links
 
 
 

1980 films
20th Century Fox films
1980s prison drama films
American prison drama films
Films scored by Lalo Schifrin
Films set in Arkansas
Films set in the 1960s
Films directed by Stuart Rosenberg
Films shot in Ohio
Films with screenplays by W. D. Richter
1980 drama films
1980s English-language films
1980s American films